Presidential elections will be held in the Czech Republic no later than January 2028. The incumbent president Petr Pavel is eligible to run for another term, and the election will most likely be direct.

Background

2023 election
At the previous election in January 2023, Petr Pavel was elected for his first term defeating former Prime Minister Andrej Babiš. His inauguration is scheduled to be held on 9 March 2023.

Since 2023 election
Fortuna made a list of odds for the 2028 presidential election soon after the 2023 election. Petr Pavel was viewed as front runner. Other potential candidates with a chance to win included Prime Minister Petr Fiala, Minister of Interior Vít Rakušan and President of the Senate Miloš Vystrčil.

Candidates

Speculative
 Pavel Fischer, Senator and candidate in the 2018 and 2023 elections, did not rule out becoming a candidate again when asked, commenting "you will hear from me again." 
 Petr Pavel, the incumbent President, is eligible to run for second term. He said on 6 March 2023 that he might not seek reelection, as he considers it "reasonable that a person remains in such an office for only one term". He added that when there are two presidential terms possible, the president could behave during their first term to be reelected, in order to enjoy their second term.
 Tomáš Sedláček, economist expressed interest in running.

References

Future elections in the Czech Republic